The Viola Concerto is a composition for solo viola and orchestra by the American composer Nico Muhly.  Composed in 2014, the work was jointly commissioned by the Orquesta Nacionales de España, the Detroit Symphony Orchestra, Festival de Saint Denis, and the National Arts Centre Orchestra.  It was first performed on February 6, 2015 by the violist Nadia Sirota and the Orquesta Nacionales de España under the conductor Nicholas Collon.  The piece was later given its United States premiere on October 23, 2015, by Sirota and the Detroit Symphony Orchestra under Leonard Slatkin.

Composition
The Viola Concerto has a duration of approximately 24 minutes and is composed in three connected sections.  The piece was written specifically for the violist Nadia Sirota, with whom Muhly has held a lasting artistic relationship since they attended Juilliard School together.

Instrumentation
The work is scored for a solo viola and an orchestra comprising two flutes, piccolo, two oboes, Cor anglais, two clarinets, bass clarinet, two bassoons, four horns, three trumpets, two trombones, bass trombone, tuba, three percussionists, piano (doubling celesta), and strings.

Reception
Reviewing the United States premiere, Mark Stryker of the Detroit Free Press highly lauded the composition, writing:
He continued:

References

Compositions by Nico Muhly
2014 compositions
Muhly
Music commissioned by the Detroit Symphony Orchestra